Leipoldtia is a genus of flowering plants belonging to the family Aizoaceae.

It is native to Namibia and the Cape Provinces (region of the South African Republic).

The genus name of Leipoldtia is in honour of C. Louis Leipoldt (1880–1947), a South African poet, dramatist, medical doctor, reporter and food expert.
It was first described and published in Fl. Pl. South Africa Vol.7 on table 256 in 1927.

Known species
According to Kew:
Leipoldtia alborosea 
Leipoldtia calandra 
Leipoldtia compacta 
Leipoldtia frutescens 
Leipoldtia gigantea 
Leipoldtia klaverensis 
Leipoldtia laxa 
Leipoldtia lunata 
Leipoldtia nevillei 
Leipoldtia rosea 
Leipoldtia schultzei 
Leipoldtia uniflora 
Leipoldtia weigangiana

References

Aizoaceae
Aizoaceae genera
Plants described in 1927
Flora of Namibia
Taxa named by Louisa Bolus